"Tennessee River Run" is a song co-written and recorded by American country music artist Darryl Worley.  It was released in July 2003 as the third single from the album I Miss My Friend.  The song reached #31 on the Billboard Hot Country Singles & Tracks chart.  The song was written by Worley and Steve Leslie.

Chart performance

References

2003 singles
2002 songs
Darryl Worley songs
Songs written by Darryl Worley
Song recordings produced by Frank Rogers (record producer)
Song recordings produced by James Stroud
DreamWorks Records singles
Music videos directed by Shaun Silva